Mandwa is a village in Raigad district, Maharashtra, India. It is popular as a weekend beach destination from Mumbai city, mainly because of the direct Ferry services available near Mandwa Beach to and from Mumbai.

In movies, Mandwa has been popularized by Amitabh and Hrithik's Agneepath series respectively.

Transport 

Mandwa serves as the changeover point for Ferry services from the state capital of Mumbai and buses bound for the district headquarters at Alibag. It is close to Kihim beach. Mandwa beach lies 6 kilometers from Rewas and close to Mandawa town.

In 2011, the Maharashtra Maritime Board (MMB), proposed to run roll on roll off (RORO) services from Ferry Wharf to Mandwa.

In popular culture 
 Agneepath (1990)
 Agneepath (2012)

See also 
 Mandva, village and former princeley state in Bharuch district, Gujarat state, western India.

References

External links 
 Mandwa – Kihim at Amazing Maharashtra

Villages in Raigad district
Beaches of Maharashtra
Tourist attractions in Raigad district